Dava Sobel (born June 15, 1947) is an American writer of popular expositions of scientific topics. Her books include Longitude, about English clockmaker John Harrison; Galileo's Daughter, about Galileo's daughter Maria Celeste; and The Glass Universe: How the Ladies of the Harvard Observatory Took the Measure of the Stars about the Harvard Computers.

Biography
Sobel was born in The Bronx, New York City. She graduated from the Bronx High School of Science and Binghamton University. She wrote Longitude: The True Story of a Lone Genius Who Solved the Greatest Scientific Problem of His Time in 1995. The story was made into a television movie, of the same name by Charles Sturridge and Granada Film in 1999, and was shown in the United States by A&E.

Her book Galileo's Daughter: A Historical Memoir of Science, Faith, and Love was a finalist for the 2000 Pulitzer Prize for Biography or Autobiography.

She holds honorary doctor of letters degrees from the University of Bath and Middlebury College, Vermont, both awarded in 2002.

Sobel made her first foray into teaching at the University of Chicago as the Vare Writer-in-Residence in the winter of 2006. She taught a one-quarter seminar on writing about science.

She served as a judge for the PEN/E. O. Wilson Literary Science Writing Award in 2012.

Sobel is the niece of journalist Ruth Gruber and the cousin of epidemiologist David Michaels.

Legacy
The asteroid 30935 Davasobel is named after her.

Sobel states she is a chaser of solar eclipses and that "it's the closest thing to witnessing a miracle". As of August 2012 she had seen eight, and planned to see the November 2012 total solar eclipse in Australia.

Publications
 
 
 
 
 Longitude: The True Story of a Lone Genius Who Solved the Greatest Scientific Problem of His Time (1995) .  – the genius in question was John Harrison, who spent decades trying to convince the British Admiralty of the accuracy of his naval timepieces and their use in determining longitude when at sea in order to win the longitude prize. The book itself won the 1997 British Book of the Year award.
 Galileo's Daughter: A Historical Memoir of Science, Faith, and Love (2000) 
 The Best American Science Writing 2004 (editor) , 
 The Planets: A discourse on the discovery, science, history and mythology, of the planets in our solar system, with one chapter devoted to each of the celestial spheres. (2005) , 
  
 The Glass Universe: How the Ladies of the Harvard Observatory Took the Measure of the Stars (2016) ,

Recognition
She was named a Fellow of the American Physical Society in 2022 "for outstanding writings covering many centuries of key developments in physics and astronomy and the people central to those developments".

References

External links

 

 Podcast of Dava Sobel discussing The Origins of Longitude at the Shanghai International Literary Festival

1947 births
Living people
20th-century American non-fiction writers
20th-century American women writers
21st-century American non-fiction writers
21st-century American women writers
American science writers
American women non-fiction writers
Antioch College alumni
Binghamton University alumni
The Bronx High School of Science alumni
Scientific American people
Women science writers
Fellows of the American Physical Society